Nariman Kurbanov (born 6 December 1997) is a Kazakhstani artistic gymnast. He competed at the World Artistic Gymnastics Championships in 2017, 2018 and 2019.

Career 

He represented Kazakhstan at the 2018 Asian Games held in Jakarta, Indonesia. He finished in 6th place in the men's pommel horse event and Kazakhstan also finished in 6th place in the men's artistic team event.

In 2019, he won the silver medal in the pommel horse event at the Summer Universiade held in Naples, Italy.

Skills 

The following skill is named after him.

References

External links 
 

Living people
1997 births
Place of birth missing (living people)
Kazakhstani male artistic gymnasts
Universiade medalists in gymnastics
Universiade silver medalists for Kazakhstan
Medalists at the 2019 Summer Universiade
Gymnasts at the 2018 Asian Games
Asian Games competitors for Kazakhstan
21st-century Kazakhstani people